Baisha is a town of Xinluo District, Longyan, Fujian, China. , it has 31 villages under its administration.

References

Township-level divisions of Fujian
Longyan